Spielberg is a 2017 American documentary film directed by Susan Lacy, and is centered on the career of film director Steven Spielberg. It premiered at the 2017 New York Film Festival and aired on HBO on October 7, 2017.

The documentary chronicles Spielberg's career, including interviews with collaborators, family and friends. Some of the events explored, particularly of his early life, would go on to be dramatized in Spielberg's 2022 semi-autobiographical film The Fabelmans.

Interviews

J. J. Abrams
Leah Adler †
Bob Balaban
Christian Bale
Eric Bana
Drew Barrymore
Cate Blanchett
Steven Bochco
James Brolin
Bill Butler
Rick Carter
Francis Ford Coppola
Peter Coyote
Daniel Craig
Tom Cruise
Daniel Day-Lewis
Brian De Palma
Laura Dern
Leonardo DiCaprio
Richard Dreyfuss
David Edelstein
Roger Ernest
Sally Field
Ralph Fiennes
Harrison Ford
David Geffen
Jeff Goldblum
Doris Kearns Goodwin
Tom Hanks
J. Hoberman
Dustin Hoffman
Norman Howell
Holly Hunter
Annette Insdorf
Joanna Johnston
Michael Kahn
Janusz Kaminski
Lawrence Kasdan
Jeffrey Katzenberg
Ben Kingsley
Kathleen Kennedy
David Koepp
Tony Kushner
George Lucas
Laurie MacDonald
Frank Marshall
Janet Maslin
Melissa Mathison †
Todd McCarthy
Ronald Meyer
Dennis Muren
Liam Neeson
Walter Parkes
Michael Phillips
Martin Scorsese
A. O. Scott
Sid Sheinberg
Adam Somner
Anne Spielberg
Arnold Spielberg
Nancy Spielberg
Sue Spielberg
Tom Stoppard
John Williams
Oprah Winfrey
Robert Zemeckis
Vilmos Zsigmond †

Interviews with Karen Allen, Benedict Cumberbatch, Anthony Hopkins and Jude Law were also conducted but not included in the final film.

Archive Footage was also shown of Joan Crawford, Goldie Hawn, Amy Irving, Marcia Lucas, Dan Rather, Dinah Shore, Sasha Spielberg, & Theo Spielberg.

† = Person interviewed died prior to the documentary's airing.

Production
The documentary was announced in July 2017 by HBO, with it set to air on October 7 later that year. A trailer for the documentary was released in September, with a list of those interviewed released as well.

Release
Prior to its October 7 airing on the HBO channel, the documentary was screened at the 2017 New York Film Festival.

Critical response
On review aggregator website Rotten Tomatoes, the film has an approval rating of 92% based on 37 reviews and an average rating of 7.6/10. The website's critical consensus reads, "Spielberg takes a behind-the-scenes look at one of modern cinema's most spellbinding talents, with absorbing — albeit somewhat uncritical — results." On Metacritic, which assigns a normalized rating to reviews, the film has a weighted average score of 71 out of 100 based 14 critics, indicating "generally favorable reviews".

See also
The Fabelmans, Spielberg's 2022 semi-autobiographical coming-of-age film that dramatizes some of the events of his early life through an original story of young aspiring filmmaker Sammy Fabelman, a character based on Spielberg.

References

External links
 Spielberg on HBO
 
 

Steven Spielberg
Documentary films about film directors and producers
HBO documentary films
2017 films
2010s English-language films
2010s American films